The 1983–84 Major Indoor Soccer League season was the sixth in league history and ended with the Baltimore Blast winning their first MISL championship. The Blast would beat the St. Louis Steamers in the championship series, the third time in five seasons the Steamers would lose in the MISL championship round. This would be the first time the MISL finals would be a best-of-seven series, part of the league's expanded playoff format.

Recap
With the North American Soccer League restarting their indoor league in the fall of 1983, the defending champion San Diego Sockers, Chicago Sting and Golden Bay Earthquakes would not rejoin the MISL for the upcoming season. To replace the teams, the Tacoma Stars (actually the reactivated Denver Avalanche) began play this season.

While there were some franchises who would begin a run of respectability at the box office, the Cleveland Force chief among them, others would see the end of their run. The New York Arrows, Buffalo Stallions and Phoenix Pride would all go out of business at the end of the season. Despite winning the first four MISL titles, the Arrows never gained a foothold in the New York market. Changing the name of the Phoenix franchise (GM Ted Podleski hated the Inferno name, and wanted a name more in tune with his Christian beliefs) would not bring about an improved record and new owner Bruce Merrill was ready to fold after losing $2 million in less than a year. The Stallions, in particular, would be caught trying to move out of their Buffalo Memorial Auditorium offices without paying back rent, similar to what had happened with the NFL's Baltimore Colts a few months earlier.

Not all news was bad. The Force and Blast routinely drew strong crowds, and the new franchise in Tacoma nearly made the playoffs. The MISL drew 2.5 million to their games, and another 300,000 attended the playoff games. One game was televised on CBS (Game 3 of the championship series on June 2), as well.

After the season, the Memphis Americans would move to Las Vegas.

Teams

Regular season schedule

The 1983–84 regular season schedule ran from November 4, 1983, to April 21, 1984. 
It would be the first time in MISL history that the length of the schedule stayed the same as the previous year. In this case, each team continued to play 48 games apiece.

Final standings

Playoff teams in bold.

Playoffs

Quarterfinals

Semifinals

Championship Series

Regular Season Player Statistics

Scoring leaders 
GP = Games Played, G = Goals, A = Assists, Pts = Points

Leading goalkeepers 
Note: GP = Games played; Min = Minutes played; GA = Goals against; GAA = Goals against average; W = Wins; L = Losses

Playoff Player Statistics

Scoring leaders 
GP = Games Played, G = Goals, A = Assists, Pts = Points

Leading goalkeepers 
Note: GP = Games played; Min = Minutes played; GA = Goals against; GAA = Goals against average; W = Wins; L = Losses

All-MISL Teams

League awards
Most Valuable Player: Stan Stamenkovic, Baltimore

Scoring Champion: Stan Stamenkovic, Baltimore

Pass Master: Stan Stamenkovic, Baltimore

Defender of the Year: Kim Roentved, Wichita

Rookie of the Year: Kevin Maher, Pittsburgh

Goalkeeper of the Year: Slobo Ilijevski, St. Louis

Coach of the Year: Kenny Cooper, Baltimore

Championship Series Most Valuable Player: Scott Manning, Baltimore

Team Attendance Totals

References

External links
 The Year 1983 in North American Soccer
 The Year 1984 in North American Soccer 

Major Indoor Soccer League (1978–1992) seasons
Major
Major